AB6IX (pronounced as A-B-Six) is a South Korean boy band formed by Brand New Music. The group currently consists of four members: Jeon Woong, Kim Dong-hyun, Park Woo-jin and Lee Dae-hwi. Former leader Lim Young-min's departure from the group was announced on June 8, 2020.

The group debuted on May 22, 2019, with their first EP titled B:Complete.

Name
AB6IX is short for "Absolute Six". Their name is also an abbreviation of "Above BrandNew Six".

History

Pre-debut
Lim Young-min, Kim Dong-hyun, Park Woo-jin and Lee Dae-hwi participated in the Mnet survival series Produce 101 Season 2 in 2017. Dae-hwi and Woo-jin placed 3rd and 6th respectively, becoming members of the temporary boy group Wanna One. Young-min and Dong-hyun placed 15th and 28th respectively. In 2018, Dae-hwi was involved with many solo activities, including taking part in the Global MC Crew on M Countdown (on which he became a permanent host in April 2019) and being a special MC on other music shows such as Inkigayo and KCON during 2017–2018 on its Japan, Thailand, Australia, and New York stops.

Young-min and Dong-hyun debuted as the duo MXM in September 2017 with their first EP titled Unmix. The duo's name stands for "Mix and Match" and "More and More," with both having different meanings for the group. The former showcases how compatible they are as a group and the latter emphasizes their ever-growing determination for growth in the music industry. In March, they released their second EP, Match Up. In August, just 11 months after debuting, they released their first full-length album, More Than Ever, which marks the last chapter of their MIX, MATCH, MORE trilogy. The duo went on tour to 9 cities around the world and also had 4 sold out fan signs and meetings. Dae-hwi also participated in the album by producing "Hoping That You'd Love Me" and "Dawn". MXM, along with fellow Produce 101 season 2 contestants Jeong Se-woon and Lee Gwang-hyun, formed Starship and Brand New Music's project group YDPP.

Woo-jin and Dae-hwi collaborated on the single, "Candle", on January 29, 2019.

Jeon Woong had previously been a trainee under JYP, Woollim, and YG Entertainment. His pre-debut appearances include Infinite H's M/V "As Long As You're Not Crazy" and the Mnet survival show Stray Kids, as a YG trainee in the JYP vs YG episodes. 

Prior to their debut, Dae-hwi composed the song "Airplane" for the mini album Heart*Iz, released on April 1, 2019, by girl group Iz*One.

2019: Debut, B:Complete, 6ixense and touring  
The group's debut reality show BrandNewBoys premiered on April 18 on Mnet. The reality show followed the story of the five members as they prepared for their debut and also featured fun behind-the-scenes footage of their everyday lives.

On April 26, AB6IX released a full line up performance music video for "Hollywood". Lee Dae-hwi participated in writing and Park Woo-jin choreographed the song "Hollywood", which was performed on "Produce 101 Season 2" for the agency evaluation. This version of the song featured AB6IX's fifth member Jeon Woong for the first time.

AB6IX debuted on May 22 with their debut EP B:Complete and its lead single "Breathe". They held their debut showcase on the same day at Olympic Hall. This album contains seven tracks, combining the works from all five members, coming from very different musical backgrounds.

On July 27, AB6IX held their first fan meeting, called "1st ABNEW," in Singapore at The Star Theatre to celebrate the release of their debut EP B:Complete. On September 24, AB6IX collaborated with Lizzo on a remix of her song "Truth Hurts," originally released in 2017.

On October 7, AB6IX released their first studio album 6ixense and its lead single "Blind for Love".  The album peaked at #30 on Billboards Social 50 Chart on October 15 after being on there for 4 weeks. On November 9, the group held their first solo concert titled "6ixense" in South Korea at Olympic Gymnastics Arena.

2020: 5nally, Young-min's departure, Vivid, and Salute
AB6IX released their digital EP 5nally on February 13, 2020. The EP contains five solo tracks, one for each member.

On February 7, it was announced the European leg of their 6IXENSE tour was cancelled due to health concerns over the COVID-19 pandemic and later on March 11, 2020, it was announced that they would also cancel the U.S. leg of the tour.

On June 8, Brand New Music announced that Young-min will be leaving the group following his DUI. As a result, the group's comeback with their second EP Vivid and its lead single "The Answer", originally scheduled for June 8, was postponed to June 29.

On August 25, it was announced that AB6IX would be holding their first online solo concert titled "So Vivid" on September 12.

AB6IX released their third EP Salute and its lead single of the same name on November 2.

2021: Salute: A New Hope, Mo' Complete: Have a Dream, Mo' Complete and Japanese debut
On January 7, AB6IX released a remix of Why Don't We's "Fallin' (Adrenaline)". On January 18, the group released the repackaged version of their third EP titled Salute: A New Hope and its lead single "Stay Young".

On April 26, AB6IX released their fourth EP Mo' Complete: Have a Dream and its lead single "Close".

On May 24, AB6IX released the promotional single "Gemini" through Universe Music for the mobile application, Universe.

On September 27, AB6IX released their second studio album Mo' Complete and its lead single "Cherry".

On November 24, AB6IX made their Japanese debut under Victor Entertainment with their first Japanese EP Absolute 6ix.

2022: Complete with You, A to B and Savior
On January 17, AB6IX released the special album Complete with You and its lead single "1, 2, 3".

On May 18, AB6IX released the fifth EP A to B.

In June, AB6IX began their fan meeting tour 'AB_NEW AREA', with the first events held on June 4 and 5 in Seoul. They then had evens in Japan and the United States. Then, on August 27, they held a fan meeting in Bangkok, Thailand.

On August 17, AB6IX released their second Japanese EP Savior. 

On September 15, AB6IX released the song "Moonlight", a collaboration with Faroese singer Reiley.

AB6IX released their sixth EP on October 4, called Take a Chance, with the title track "Sugarcoat".

Other ventures

Endorsements 
On April 19, 2019, Lee Dae-hwi was selected for solo endorsement deal as a campaign model of "Fanta" beverage brand Coca-Cola Korea. Before the official debut of AB6IX, the members were selected as a beauty model of the Korean beauty brand "Acwell" on April 24, 2019.

On August 29, 2019, AB6IX was chosen as the new model of "Elite" uniform for the 2020 new semester. On September 25, 2019, AB6IX was appointed as the image cast of ABC-Mart for product "Nike Court Vision".

Ambassadors 
On September 19, 2019, AB6IX was officially appointed as the newest ambassadors for Korea Scout Association. On February 20, 2020, AB6IX was appointed as public relations ambassador for Youth Cyber Violence Prevention Education Program by Samsung Group, Green Tree Foundation and Social Welfare Community Chest.

Members
Adapted from their official website.

Present members
 Jeon Woong (전웅)
 Kim Dong-hyun (김동현)
 Park Woo-jin (박우진)
 Lee Dae-hwi (이대휘)

Former members
 Lim Young-min (임영민)

Discography

Studio albums

Reissues

Extended plays

Singles

Other charted songs

Other releases

Videography

Music videos

Album videos

Filmography

Reality shows

Web series

Concerts and tours

Showcase 

 AB6IX 1st Debut Showcase "B:Complete" (2019) 
 AB6IX 1st Album Showcase "6ixense" (2019) 
AB6IX 3rd EP Online Showcase "Salute" (2020) 
AB6IX 4th EP Comeback Showcase "Mo Complete : Have A Dream" (2021)

Online concert 

 AB6IX Online Concert "So Vivid" (2020)

Headlining tour 

 AB6IX 1st World Tour "6ixense" (2019–2020) 
 AB6IX Fanmeeting Tour "AB_NEW AREA" (2022)

Awards and nominations

Korean

International

Other awards

Notes

References

External links
  

AB6IX
2019 establishments in South Korea
Musical groups from Seoul
K-pop music groups
Musical groups established in 2019
South Korean dance music groups
South Korean boy bands
Brand New Music artists
Japanese-language singers of South Korea